Ding Weifen (1874－12 May 1954) was a founding father of the Kuomintang. He served as Vice-President of Control Yuan from 28 December 1931 to 1935.

Biography
Ding was born in Taoluo Town of Rizhao, Shandong in 1874, the son of Ding Yici, a teacher. His courtesy name was Dingcheng and Dingchen. He had an elder brother, Ding Weisong. In 1903, he attended Baoding Normal College. A year later, he went to Japan to study law at Meiji University. He joined the Tongmenghui on October 21, 1905. He founded the Bell with Jiang Yansheng. He returned to the China in Spring 1907, becoming President of Shandong School of Law and Politics. During 1911, he took part in Wuchang Uprising. He moved on to the house of representatives in 1912. He was a member of congress between 1917 and 1922. He founded North China Weekly in 1918. He served as Head of the Propaganda Department and the Training Department of Kuomintang from 1927 to 1929. He was a member of the National Government from 17 September 1927 to 1947.

He was the Secretary General of Central Party Committee of Kuomintang in 1931. On December 28, 1931, he was appointed the Vice-President of Control Yuan, a position he held until 1935. He was a member of Control Yuan from 31 May 1948 to 12 May 1954.

On May 12, 1954, he died in Taipei, Taiwan.

Personal life
His daughter, Ding Yujuan, was married to hydrologist Huang Wanli.  His adopted daughter Tsun-ying Wong was one of the first group of women elected to the Legislative Yuan in 1948, and her son Samuel is an American physicist who received the Nobel Prize in 1976, with Burton Richter, for discovering the subatomic J/ψ particle. His grandson in law, Yang Le, is a member of the Chinese Academy of Sciences.

References

1874 births
1954 deaths
Politicians from Rizhao
Meiji University alumni
Academic staff of the National Sun Yat-sen University
Taiwanese people from Shandong
Members of the Control Yuan